Laplatacris is a genus of slant-faced grasshoppers in the family Acrididae. There is one described species in Laplatacris, L. dispar, found in South America.

References

External links

 

Acrididae